The Allen M. Sumner class was a group of 58 destroyers built by the United States during World War II. Another twelve ships were completed as destroyer minelayers. The class was named for Allen Melancthon Sumner, an officer in the United States Marine Corps. Often referred to as simply the Sumner, this class was distinguished from the previous  by their twin 5-inch/38 caliber gun mounts, dual rudders, additional anti-aircraft weapons, and many other advancements.

Completed in 1943–45, four Sumners were lost in the war and two were damaged so badly they were scrapped, but the surviving ships served in the US Navy into the 1970s. After being retired from the US fleet, 29 of them were sold to other navies, where they served many more years. One still exists as a museum ship in South Carolina.

Description
The first ship was laid down in May 1943, while the last was launched in April 1945. In that time, the United States produced 58 Allen M. Sumner-class destroyers.  The Allen M. Sumner class was an improvement of the previous , which were built from 1941 until 1944. In addition to three twin 5-inch/38 caliber gun mounts replacing the Fletchers' five single mounts, the Sumners had twin rudders, giving them better maneuverability for ASW work when compared to the Fletchers. The 5-inch guns were guided by a Mark 37 Gun Fire Control System with a Mark 25 fire control radar linked by a Mark 1A Fire Control Computer stabilized by a Mark 6 8,500 rpm gyro. This fire control system provided effective long-range anti-aircraft (AA) or anti-surface fire.  The Allen M. Sumners also had larger set of short-range anti-aircraft armament than the Fletchers, with 12 40 mm guns and 11 20 mm guns compared with the 10 40 mm and 7 20 mm complement typical of a late-war standard Fletcher. The initial design retained the Fletchers' heavy torpedo armament of 10  tubes in two quintuple mounts, firing the Mark 15 torpedo. As the threat from kamikaze aircraft mounted in 1945, and with few remaining Japanese warships to use torpedoes on, most of the class had the aft quintuple 21-inch torpedo tube mount replaced by an additional 40 mm quadruple mount for 16 total 40 mm guns.

The Allen M. Sumners achieved a 20% increase in 5-inch gun armament and almost a 50% increase in light AA armament on a hull the same length as a Fletcher, only  wider, and about 15 inches (38 cm) deeper in draft. The increase in standard displacement was only 150 tons, about 7.5%. Thus, the Allen M. Sumner class was a significant improvement in combat power at a small increase in cost.

See also the  destroyer minelayer (DM), twelve of which were built on hulls originally intended as Allen M. Sumners. The s were of the same design, modified with a  midship extension to carry more fuel to extend the ships' range.

Service
The Allen M. Sumners served on radar picket stations in the Battle of Okinawa, as well as other duties, and had several losses. Cooper, Meredith, Mannert L. Abele, and Drexler were lost during the war, and Hugh W. Hadley was so badly damaged by a kamikaze attack that she was scrapped soon after the war ended. In addition, Frank E. Evans was split in half in a collision with the aircraft carrier HMAS Melbourne, and never repaired. After the war most of the class (except some of the light minelayers) had their 40 mm and 20 mm guns replaced by up to six 3-inch/50 caliber guns (76 mm), and the pole mast was replaced by a tripod to carry a new, heavier radar. On most ships one depth charge rack was removed and two Hedgehog mounts added. One of the two quintuple  torpedo tube mountings had already been removed on most to make way for a quadruple 40 mm gun mounting and additional radar for the radar picket mission. 33 ships were converted under the Fleet Rehabilitation and Modernization II (FRAM II) program 1960–65, but not as extensively as the Gearings. Typically, FRAM Allen M. Sumners retained all three 5-inch/38 twin mounts and received the Drone Anti-Submarine Helicopter (DASH), two triple Mark 32 torpedo tubes for the Mark 44 torpedo, and two new single 21-inch torpedo tubes for the Mark 37 torpedo, with all 3-inch and lighter guns, previous ASW armament, and 21-inch torpedo tubes being removed. Variable Depth Sonar (VDS) was also fitted; however, ASROC was not fitted. Ships that did not receive FRAM were typically upgraded with Mk 32 triple torpedo tubes in exchange for the K-guns, but retained Hedgehog and one depth charge rack.

In Navy slang, the modified destroyers were called "FRAM cans", "can" being a contraction of "tin can", the slang term for a destroyer or destroyer escort.

Many Allen M. Sumners provided significant gunfire support in the Vietnam War. They also served as escorts for Carrier Battle Groups (Carrier Strike Groups from 2004) and Amphibious Ready Groups (Expeditionary Strike Groups from 2006). From 1965, some of the class were transferred to the Naval Reserve Force (NRF), with a partial active crew to train Naval reservists.

Disposition

The ships served in the US Navy into the 1970s. DASH was withdrawn from anti-submarine warfare (ASW) service in 1969 due to poor reliability. Lacking ASROC, the Allen M. Sumners were left without a standoff ASW capability, and were decommissioned 1970–73, with most being transferred to foreign navies. The FRAM Sumners were effectively replaced as ASW ships by the s (destroyer escorts prior to 1975), which were commissioned 1969–74 and carried a piloted helicopter, typically the Kaman SH-2 Seasprite, and ASROC. After the Allen M. Sumners were retired from the US fleet, seven were sunk by the US in fleet training exercises and 13 were scrapped, while 29 were sold to other navies (two for spare parts), where they served for many more years. 12 were sold to the Republic of China Navy and 2 were sold to the Republic of Korea Navy. 2 were sold to the Iran and 1 was sold to Turkey. 1 was sold to Greece. 2 were sold to Venezuela, 2 to Colombia, 2 sold to Chile, 5 sold to Brazil and 4 to Argentina.

Currently, only  located at Patriots Point, Charleston, South Carolina remains as a museum ship.

Other navies

Argentina 

The Argentine Navy acquired four Sumners as a more capable adjunct to their previously acquired Fletcher class destroyers.  While one was merely to provide spare parts to keep the rest of the fleet serviceable, the other three would go on and serve through the Falklands War, in which they would take a minor role.  Soon after the conflict, they were stricken and disposed of.

Ships in class

See also
List of ship classes of the Second World War

References

External links

NavSource Destroyer Photo Page
(Chinese)Old ships to be sold for scrap, including DDG-914, former DD-746 in US

 

 
Destroyer classes
 
Ship classes of the Islamic Republic of Iran Navy